The Literary Imagination in Jewish Antiquity is a monograph by Eva Mroczek, a scholar of ancient Judaism. Published by Oxford University Press in 2016, it argues that modern concepts of the Bible and even of the book itself—which refer to texts that are generally stable, finalized and/or definitive—are inapplicable to the Second Temple era of Judaism. The book suggests that scholars should avoid employing contemporary ideas of Authorship in their studies of early Jewish texts.

References

Further reading 
 

2016 non-fiction books
Biblical studies
Oxford University Press books